Sara Baume (born 1984) is an Irish novelist.

Life 
Her father is of English descent while her mother is of Irish descent. As her parents travelled around in a caravan, Sara Baume was born "on the road to Wigan Pier". When she was 4, they moved to County Cork, Ireland. She studied fine art at Dun Laoghaire College of Art and Design and creative writing at Trinity College, Dublin from where she was awarded her MPhil. She has received a Literary Fellowship from the Lannan Foundation in Santa Fe, New Mexico. Her books are published by Tramp Press in Ireland and Heinemann in Britain.

In 2015, she participated in the International Writing Program's Fall Residency at the University of Iowa, in Iowa City, IA.

Novels
Spill Simmer Falter Wither Dublin: Tramp Press, 2015. , 
A Line Made by Walking Boston; New York: Houghton Mifflin Harcourt, 2017. ,  (named for the Richard Long sculpture, A Line Made by Walking)
handiwork Dublin: Tramp Press, 2020. , 
Seven Steeples Dublin: Tramp Press, 2022. ISBN 9781916291485

Awards
Davy Byrne's Short Story Award for Solesearcher1, 2014
Hennessy New Irish Writing Award, 2015
Rooney Prize for Literature, 2015
Irish Book Award Sunday Independent Newcomer of the Year for Spill Simmer Falter Wither, 2015
Geoffrey Faber Memorial Prize, for Spill Simmer Falter Wither, 2015
Kate O’Brien Award for Spill Simmer Falter Wither, 2016
Folio Prize, shortlisted for handiwork, 2021

References

Living people
1984 births
Irish women novelists
21st-century Irish novelists
21st-century Irish women writers
Alumni of Trinity College Dublin
Alumni of IADT